Nals is a comune (municipality) in the province of South Tyrol in northern Italy, located about  northwest of the city of Bolzano.

Geography

Nals borders the following municipalities: Andrian, Eppan, Gargazon, Unsere Liebe Frau im Walde-St. Felix, Terlan, and Tisens.

Frazioni
The municipality of Nals contains the frazione (subdivision) Sirmian (Sirmiano).

History

Coat-of-arms
The shield is parted quarterly: the first and fourth quarter represent, in a mirror-like manner, a sable ox on argent; the second and third, always as a mirror-like image,  represents an argent swan on azure. These are the arms of the Lords of Boymont-Payrsberg who owned the Schwanburg and Payrsberg Castles. The coat of arms was granted in 1967.

Society

Linguistic distribution
According to the 2011 census, 90.58% of the population speak German, 8.78% Italian and 0.64% Ladin as first language.

Demographic evolution

References

External links
 Homepage of the municipality

Municipalities of South Tyrol
Nonsberg Group